The United States Declaration of Independence, officially The unanimous Declaration of the thirteen  States of America, is the pronouncement and founding document adopted by the Second Continental Congress meeting at Pennsylvania State House, which was later renamed Independence Hall, in Philadelphia, Pennsylvania, on July 4, 1776. Enacted during the American Revolution, the Declaration explains why the Thirteen Colonies at war with the Kingdom of Great Britain regarded themselves as thirteen independent sovereign states and no longer subject to British colonial rule. With the Declaration, the 13 states took a collective first step in forming the United States and, de facto, formalized the American Revolutionary War, which had been ongoing since April 1775.

The Declaration of Independence was signed by 56 of America's Founding Fathers who Second Continental Congress delegates from New Hampshire, Massachusetts Bay, Rhode Island and Providence Plantations, Connecticut, New York, New Jersey, Pennsylvania, Maryland, Delaware, Virginia, North Carolina, South Carolina, and Georgia. The Declaration became one of the most circulated and widely reprinted documents in early American history.

The Committee of Five drafted the Declaration to be ready when Congress voted on independence. John Adams, a leading proponent of independence, persuaded the Committee of Five to charge Thomas Jefferson with authoring the document's original draft, which the Second Continental Congress then edited. The Declaration was a formal explanation of why the Continental Congress had voted to declare its independence from Great Britain, a year after the American Revolutionary War broke out. The Lee Resolution for independence was passed unanimously by the Congress on July 2.

After ratifying the text on July 4, Congress issued the Declaration of Independence in several forms. It was initially published as the printed Dunlap broadside that was widely distributed and read to the public. Jefferson's original draft is currently preserved at the Library of Congress in Washington, D.C., complete with changes made by Adams and Benjamin Franklin, and Jefferson's notes of changes made by Congress. The best-known version of the Declaration is the signed copy now displayed at the National Archives in Washington, D.C., which is popularly regarded as the official document. This engrossed copy was ordered by Congress on July 19 and signed primarily on August 2, 1776.

The sources and interpretation of the Declaration have been the subject of much scholarly inquiry. The Declaration justified the independence of the United States by listing 27 colonial grievances against King George III and by asserting certain natural and legal rights, including a right of revolution. Its original purpose was to announce independence, and references to the text of the Declaration were few in the following years. Abraham Lincoln made it the centerpiece of his policies and his rhetoric, as in the Gettysburg Address of 1863. Since then, it has become a well-known statement on human rights, particularly its second sentence: "We hold these truths to be self-evident, that all men are created equal, that they are endowed by their Creator with certain unalienable Rights, that among these are Life, Liberty and the pursuit of Happiness."

The declaration was made to guarantee equal rights for every person, and if it had been intended for only a certain section of people, Congress would have left it as "rights of Englishmen". Stephen Lucas called it "one of the best-known sentences in the English language", with historian Joseph Ellis writing that the document contains "the most potent and consequential words in American history". The passage came to represent a moral standard to which the United States should strive. This view was notably promoted by Lincoln, who considered the Declaration to be the foundation of his political philosophy and argued that it is a statement of principles through which the United States Constitution should be interpreted.

The Declaration of Independence inspired many similar documents in other countries, the first being the 1789 Declaration of United Belgian States issued during the Brabant Revolution in the Austrian Netherlands. It also served as the primary model for numerous declarations of independence in Europe and Latin America, as well as Africa (Liberia) and Oceania (New Zealand) during the first half of the 19th century.

Background

By the time the Declaration of Independence was adopted in July 1776, the Thirteen Colonies and Great Britain had been at war for more than a year. Relations had been deteriorating between the colonies and the mother country since 1763. Parliament enacted a series of measures to increase revenue from the colonies, such as the Stamp Act of 1765 and the Townshend Acts of 1767. Parliament believed that these acts were a legitimate means of having the colonies pay their fair share of the costs to keep them in the British Empire.

Many colonists, however, had developed a different perspective of the empire. The colonies were not directly represented in Parliament, and colonists argued that Parliament had no right to levy taxes upon them. This tax dispute was part of a larger divergence between British and American interpretations of the British Constitution and the extent of Parliament's authority in the colonies. The orthodox British view, dating from the Glorious Revolution of 1688, was that Parliament was the supreme authority throughout the empire, and anything that Parliament did was constitutional. In the colonies, however, the idea had developed that the British Constitution recognized certain fundamental rights that no government could violate, including Parliament. After the Townshend Acts, some essayists questioned whether Parliament had any legitimate jurisdiction in the colonies. Anticipating the arrangement of the British Commonwealth, by 1774 American writers such as Samuel Adams, James Wilson, and Thomas Jefferson argued that Parliament was the legislature of Great Britain only, and that the colonies, which had their own legislatures, were connected to the rest of the empire only through their allegiance to the Crown.

Congress convenes

In 1774, Parliament passed the Coercive Acts, known as the Intolerable Acts in the colonies. This was intended to punish the colonists for the Gaspee Affair of 1772 and the Boston Tea Party of 1773. Many colonists considered the Coercive Acts to be in violation of the British Constitution and thus a threat to the liberties of all of British America; the First Continental Congress convened in Philadelphia in September 1774 to coordinate a formal response. Congress organized a boycott of British goods and petitioned the king for repeal of the acts. These measures were unsuccessful, since King George and the Prime Minister, Lord North, were determined to enforce parliamentary supremacy over America. As the king wrote to North in November 1774, "blows must decide whether they are to be subject to this country or independent".

Most colonists still hoped for reconciliation with Great Britain, even after fighting began in the American Revolutionary War at Lexington and Concord in April 1775. The Second Continental Congress convened at the Pennsylvania State House in Philadelphia in May 1775, and some delegates hoped for eventual independence, but no one yet advocated declaring it. Many colonists believed that Parliament no longer had sovereignty over them, but they were still loyal to King George, thinking he would intercede on their behalf. They were disabused of that notion in late 1775, when the king rejected Congress's second petition, issued a Proclamation of Rebellion, and announced before Parliament on October 26 that he was considering "friendly offers of foreign assistance" to suppress the rebellion. A pro-American minority in Parliament warned that the government was driving the colonists toward independence.

Toward independence

Thomas Paine's pamphlet Common Sense was published in January 1776, when the king clearly was not inclined to act as a conciliator. Paine, recently arrived in the colonies from England, argued in favor of colonial independence, advocating republicanism as an alternative to monarchy and hereditary rule. Common Sense made a persuasive, impassioned case for independence, which had not been given serious consideration in the colonies. Paine linked independence with Protestant beliefs, as a means to present a distinctly American political identity, and he initiated open debate on a topic few had dared to discuss. Public support for separation from Great Britain steadily increased after the publication of Common Sense.

Some colonists still hoped for reconciliation, but public support for independence further strengthened in early 1776. In February 1776, colonists learned of Parliament's passage of the Prohibitory Act, which established a blockade of American ports and declared American ships to be enemy vessels. John Adams, a strong supporter of independence, believed that Parliament had effectively declared American independence before Congress had been able to. Adams labeled the Prohibitory Act the "Act of Independency", calling it "a compleat Dismemberment of the British Empire". Support for declaring independence grew even more when it was confirmed that King George had hired German mercenaries to use against his American subjects.

Despite this growing popular support for independence, Congress lacked the clear authority to declare it. Delegates had been elected to Congress by 13 different governments, which included extralegal conventions, ad hoc committees, and elected assemblies, and they were bound by the instructions given to them. Regardless of their personal opinions, delegates could not vote to declare independence unless their instructions permitted such an action. Several colonies, in fact, expressly prohibited their delegates from taking any steps toward separation from Great Britain, while other delegations had instructions that were ambiguous on the issue; consequently, advocates of independence sought to have the Congressional instructions revised. For Congress to declare independence, a majority of delegations would need authorization to vote for it, and at least one colonial government would need to specifically instruct its delegation to propose a declaration of independence in Congress. Between April and July 1776, a "complex political war" was waged to bring this about.

Revising instructions
In the campaign to revise Congressional instructions, many Americans formally expressed their support for separation from Great Britain in what were effectively state and local declarations of independence. Historian Pauline Maier identifies more than ninety such declarations that were issued throughout the Thirteen Colonies from April to July 1776. These "declarations" took a variety of forms. Some were formal written instructions for Congressional delegations, such as the Halifax Resolves of April 12, with which North Carolina became the first colony to explicitly authorize its delegates to vote for independence. Others were legislative acts that officially ended British rule in individual colonies, such as the Rhode Island legislature renouncing its allegiance to Great Britain on May 4—the first colony to do so. Many "declarations" were resolutions adopted at town or county meetings that offered support for independence. A few came in the form of jury instructions, such as the statement issued on April 23, 1776, by Chief Justice William Henry Drayton of South Carolina: "the law of the land authorizes me to declare ... that George the Third, King of Great Britain ... has no authority over us, and we owe no obedience to him." Most of these declarations are now obscure, having been overshadowed by the resolution for independence, approved by Congress on July 2, and the declaration of independence, approved and printed on July 4 and signed in August. The modern scholarly consensus is that the best-known and earliest of the local declarations is most likely inauthentic, the Mecklenburg Declaration of Independence, allegedly adopted in May 1775 (a full year before other local declarations).

Some colonies held back from endorsing independence. Resistance was centered in the middle colonies of New York, New Jersey, Maryland, Pennsylvania, and Delaware. Advocates of independence saw Pennsylvania as the key; if that colony could be converted to the pro-independence cause, it was believed that the others would follow. On May 1, however, opponents of independence retained control of the Pennsylvania Assembly in a special election that had focused on the question of independence. In response, Congress passed a resolution on May 10 which had been promoted by John Adams and Richard Henry Lee, calling on colonies without a "government sufficient to the exigencies of their affairs" to adopt new governments. The resolution passed unanimously, and was even supported by Pennsylvania's John Dickinson, the leader of the anti-independence faction in Congress, who believed that it did not apply to his colony.

May 15 preamble

As was the custom, Congress appointed a committee to draft a preamble to explain the purpose of the resolution. John Adams wrote the preamble, which stated that because King George had rejected reconciliation and was hiring foreign mercenaries to use against the colonies, "it is necessary that the exercise of every kind of authority under the said crown should be totally suppressed". Adams'  preamble was meant to encourage the overthrow of the governments of Pennsylvania and Maryland, which were still under proprietary governance. Congress passed the preamble on May 15 after several days of debate, but four of the middle colonies voted against it, and the Maryland delegation walked out in protest. Adams regarded his May 15 preamble effectively as an American declaration of independence, although a formal declaration would still have to be made.

Lee's resolution

On the same day that Congress passed Adams' preamble, the Virginia Convention set the stage for a formal Congressional declaration of independence. On May 15, the Convention instructed Virginia's congressional delegation "to propose to that respectable body to declare the United Colonies free and independent States, absolved from all allegiance to, or dependence upon, the Crown or Parliament of Great Britain". In accordance with those instructions, Richard Henry Lee of Virginia presented a three-part resolution to Congress on June 7. The motion was seconded by John Adams, calling on Congress to declare independence, form foreign alliances, and prepare a plan of colonial confederation. The part of the resolution relating to declaring independence read: "Resolved, that these United Colonies are, and of right ought to be, free and independent States, that they are absolved from all allegiance to the British Crown, and that all political connection between them and the State of Great Britain is, and ought to be, totally dissolved."

Lee's resolution met with resistance in the ensuing debate. Opponents of the resolution conceded that reconciliation was unlikely with Great Britain, while arguing that declaring independence was premature, and that securing foreign aid should take priority. Advocates of the resolution countered that foreign governments would not intervene in an internal British struggle, and so a formal declaration of independence was needed before foreign aid was possible. All Congress needed to do, they insisted, was to "declare a fact which already exists". Delegates from Pennsylvania, Delaware, New Jersey, Maryland, and New York were still not yet authorized to vote for independence, however, and some of them threatened to leave Congress if the resolution were adopted. Congress, therefore, voted on June 10 to postpone further discussion of Lee's resolution for three weeks. Until then, Congress decided that a committee should prepare a document announcing and explaining independence in case Lee's resolution was approved when it was brought up again in July.

Final push

Support for a Congressional declaration of independence was consolidated in the final weeks of June 1776. On June 14, the Connecticut Assembly instructed its delegates to propose independence and, the following day, the legislatures of New Hampshire and Delaware authorized their delegates to declare independence. In Pennsylvania, political struggles ended with the dissolution of the colonial assembly, and a new Conference of Committees under Thomas McKean authorized Pennsylvania's delegates to declare independence on June 18. The Provincial Congress of New Jersey had been governing the province since January 1776; they resolved on June 15 that Royal Governor William Franklin was "an enemy to the liberties of this country" and had him arrested. On June 21, they chose new delegates to Congress and empowered them to join in a declaration of independence.

Only Maryland and New York had yet to authorize independence toward the end of June. Previously, Maryland's delegates had walked out when the Continental Congress adopted Adams'   May 15 preamble, and had sent to the Annapolis Convention for instructions. On May 20, the Annapolis Convention rejected Adams' preamble, instructing its delegates to remain against independence. But Samuel Chase went to Maryland and, thanks to local resolutions in favor of independence, was able to get the Annapolis Convention to change its mind on June 28. Only the New York delegates were unable to get revised instructions. When Congress had been considering the resolution of independence on June 8, the New York Provincial Congress told the delegates to wait. But on June 30, the Provincial Congress evacuated New York as British forces approached, and would not convene again until July 10. This meant that New York's delegates would not be authorized to declare independence until after Congress had made its decision.

Draft and adoption

Political maneuvering was setting the stage for an official declaration of independence even while a document was being written to explain the decision. On June 11, 1776, Congress appointed a "Committee of Five" to draft a declaration, consisting of John Adams of Massachusetts, Benjamin Franklin of Pennsylvania, Thomas Jefferson of Virginia, Robert R. Livingston of New York, and Roger Sherman of Connecticut. The committee took no minutes, so there is some uncertainty about how the drafting process proceeded; contradictory accounts were written many years later by Jefferson and Adams, too many years to be regarded as entirely reliable—although their accounts are frequently cited. What is certain is that the committee discussed the general outline which the document should follow and decided that Jefferson would write the first draft. The committee in general, and Jefferson in particular, thought that Adams should write the document, but Adams persuaded them to choose Jefferson and promised to consult with him personally. Considering Congress's busy schedule, Jefferson probably had limited time for writing over the next 17 days, and he likely wrote the draft quickly. Examination of the text of the early Declaration drafts reflects Jefferson's reference to the ideas and writings of John Locke and Thomas Paine, author of Common Sense. He then consulted the other members of the Committee of Five who offered minor changes, and then produced another copy incorporating these alterations. The committee presented this copy to the Congress on June 28, 1776. The title of the document was "A Declaration by the Representatives of the United States of America, in General Congress assembled."

Congress ordered that the draft "lie on the table" and then methodically edited Jefferson's primary document for the next two days, shortening it by a fourth, removing unnecessary wording, and improving sentence structure. They removed Jefferson's assertion that King George III had forced slavery onto the colonies, in order to moderate the document and appease those in South Carolina and Georgia, both states which had significant involvement in the slave trade. Jefferson later wrote in his autobiography that Northern states were also supportive towards the clauses removal, "for though their people had very few slaves themselves, yet they had been pretty considerable carriers of them to others." Jefferson wrote that Congress had "mangled" his draft version, but the Declaration that was finally produced was "the majestic document that inspired both contemporaries and posterity", in the words of his biographer John Ferling.

Congress tabled the draft of the declaration on Monday, July 1 and resolved itself into a committee of the whole, with Benjamin Harrison of Virginia presiding, and they resumed debate on Lee's resolution of independence. John Dickinson made one last effort to delay the decision, arguing that Congress should not declare independence without first securing a foreign alliance and finalizing the Articles of Confederation. John Adams gave a speech in reply to Dickinson, restating the case for an immediate declaration.

A vote was taken after a long day of speeches, each colony casting a single vote, as always. The delegation for each colony numbered from two to seven members, and each delegation voted among themselves to determine the colony's vote. Pennsylvania and South Carolina voted against declaring independence. The New York delegation abstained, lacking permission to vote for independence. Delaware cast no vote because the delegation was split between Thomas McKean, who voted yes, and George Read, who voted no. The remaining nine delegations voted in favor of independence, which meant that the resolution had been approved by the committee of the whole. The next step was for the resolution to be voted upon by Congress itself. Edward Rutledge of South Carolina was opposed to Lee's resolution but desirous of unanimity, and he moved that the vote be postponed until the following day.

On July 2, South Carolina reversed its position and voted for independence. In the Pennsylvania delegation, Dickinson and Robert Morris abstained, allowing the delegation to vote three-to-two in favor of independence. The tie in the Delaware delegation was broken by the timely arrival of Caesar Rodney, who voted for independence. The New York delegation abstained once again since they were still not authorized to vote for independence, although they were allowed to do so a week later by the New York Provincial Congress. The resolution of independence was adopted with twelve affirmative votes and one abstention, and the colonies formally severed political ties with Great Britain. John Adams wrote to his wife on the following day and predicted that July 2 would become a great American holiday He thought that the vote for independence would be commemorated; he did not foresee that Americans would instead celebrate Independence Day on the date when the announcement of that act was finalized.

I am apt to believe that [Independence Day] will be celebrated, by succeeding Generations, as the great anniversary Festival. It ought to be commemorated, as the Day of Deliverance by solemn Acts of Devotion to God Almighty. It ought to be solemnized with Pomp and Parade, with shews, Games, Sports, Guns, Bells, Bonfires and Illuminations from one End of this Continent to the other from this Time forward forever more.

Congress next turned its attention to the committee's draft of the declaration. They made a few changes in wording during several days of debate and deleted nearly a fourth of the text. The wording of the Declaration of Independence was approved on July 4, 1776, and sent to the printer for publication.

There is a distinct change in wording from this original broadside printing of the Declaration and the final official engrossed copy. The word "unanimous" was inserted as a result of a Congressional resolution passed on July 19, 1776: "Resolved, That the Declaration passed on the 4th, be fairly engrossed on parchment, with the title and stile of 'The unanimous declaration of the thirteen United States of America,' and that the same, when engrossed, be signed by every member of Congress." Historian George Athan Billias says: "Independence amounted to a new status of interdependence: the United States was now a sovereign nation entitled to the privileges and responsibilities that came with that status. America thus became a member of the international community, which meant becoming a maker of treaties and alliances, a military ally in diplomacy, and a partner in foreign trade on a more equal basis."

Annotated text of the engrossed declaration
The declaration is not divided into formal sections; but it is often discussed as consisting of five parts: introduction, preamble, indictment of King George III, denunciation of the British people, and conclusion.

Influences and legal status

Historians have often sought to identify the sources that most influenced the words and political philosophy of the Declaration of Independence. By Jefferson's own admission, the Declaration contained no original ideas, but was instead a statement of sentiments widely shared by supporters of the American Revolution. As he explained in 1825:

Neither aiming at originality of principle or sentiment, nor yet copied from any particular and previous writing, it was intended to be an expression of the American mind, and to give to that expression the proper tone and spirit called for by the occasion.

Jefferson's most immediate sources were two documents written in June 1776: his own draft of the preamble of the Constitution of Virginia, and George Mason's draft of the Virginia Declaration of Rights. Ideas and phrases from both of these documents appear in the Declaration of Independence. Mason's opening was:

  Section 1. That all men are by nature equally free and independent, and have certain inherent rights, of which, when they enter into a state of society, they cannot, by any compact, deprive or divest their posterity; namely, the enjoyment of life and liberty, with the means of acquiring and possessing property, and pursuing and obtaining happiness and safety.

Mason was, in turn, directly influenced by the 1689 English Declaration of Rights, which formally ended the reign of King James II. During the American Revolution, Jefferson and other Americans looked to the English Declaration of Rights as a model of how to end the reign of an unjust king. The Scottish Declaration of Arbroath (1320) and the Dutch Act of Abjuration (1581) have also been offered as models for Jefferson's Declaration, but these models are now accepted by few scholars. Maier found no evidence that the Dutch Act of Abjuration served as a model for the Declaration, and considers the argument "unpersuasive". Armitage discounts the influence of the Scottish and Dutch acts, and writes that neither was called "declarations of independence" until fairly recently. Stephen E. Lucas argued in favor of the influence of the Dutch act.

Jefferson wrote that a number of authors exerted a general influence on the words of the Declaration. English political theorist John Locke is usually cited as one of the primary influences, a man whom Jefferson called one of "the three greatest men that have ever lived". In 1922, historian Carl L. Becker wrote, "Most Americans had absorbed Locke's works as a kind of political gospel; and the Declaration, in its form, in its phraseology, follows closely certain sentences in Locke's second treatise on government." The extent of Locke's influence on the American Revolution has been questioned by some subsequent scholars, however. Historian Ray Forrest Harvey argued in 1937 for the dominant influence of Swiss jurist Jean Jacques Burlamaqui, declaring that Jefferson and Locke were at "two opposite poles" in their political philosophy, as evidenced by Jefferson's use in the Declaration of Independence of the phrase "pursuit of happiness" instead of "property". Other scholars emphasized the influence of republicanism rather than Locke's classical liberalism. Historian Garry Wills argued that Jefferson was influenced by the Scottish Enlightenment, particularly Francis Hutcheson, rather than Locke, an interpretation that has been strongly criticized.

Legal historian John Phillip Reid has written that the emphasis on the political philosophy of the Declaration has been misplaced. The Declaration is not a philosophical tract about natural rights, argues Reid, but is instead a legal document—an indictment against King George for violating the constitutional rights of the colonists. As such, it follows the process of the 1550 Magdeburg Confession, which legitimized resistance against Holy Roman Emperor Charles V in a multi-step legal formula now known as the doctrine of the lesser magistrate. Historian David Armitage has argued that the Declaration was strongly influenced by de Vattel's The Law of Nations, the dominant international law treatise of the period, and a book that Benjamin Franklin said was "continually in the hands of the members of our Congress". Armitage writes, "Vattel made independence fundamental to his definition of statehood"; therefore, the primary purpose of the Declaration was "to express the international legal sovereignty of the United States". If the United States were to have any hope of being recognized by the European powers, the American revolutionaries first had to make it clear that they were no longer dependent on Great Britain. The Declaration of Independence does not have the force of law domestically, but nevertheless it may help to provide historical and legal clarity about the Constitution and other laws.

Signing

The Declaration became official when Congress recorded its vote adopting the document on July 4; it was transposed on paper and signed by John Hancock, President of the Congress, on that day. Signatures of the other delegates were not needed to further authenticate it. The signatures of fifty-six delegates are affixed to the Declaration, though the exact date when each person signed became debatable. Jefferson, Franklin, and Adams all wrote that the Declaration was signed by Congress on July 4. But in 1796, signer Thomas McKean disputed that, because some signers were not then present, including several who were not even elected to Congress until after that date. Historians have generally accepted McKean's version of events. History particularly shows most delegates signed on August 2, 1776, and those who were not then present added their names later.

In an 1811 letter to Adams, Benjamin Rush recounted the signing in stark fashion, describing it as a scene of "pensive and awful silence". Rush said the delegates were called up, one after another, and then filed forward somberly to subscribe what each thought was their ensuing death warrant. He related that the "gloom of the morning" was briefly interrupted when the rotund Benjamin Harrison of Virginia said to a diminutive Elbridge Gerry of Massachusetts, at the signing table, "I shall have a great advantage over you, Mr. Gerry, when we are all hung for what we are now doing. From the size and weight of my body I shall die in a few minutes and be with the Angels, but from the lightness of your body you will dance in the air an hour or two before you are dead." According to Rush, Harrison's remark "procured a transient smile, but it was soon succeeded by the Solemnity with which the whole business was conducted."

The signatories include then future presidents John Adams and Thomas Jefferson, though the most legendary signature is John Hancock's. His large, flamboyant signature became iconic, and the term John Hancock emerged in the United States as a metaphor of "signature". A commonly circulated but apocryphal account claims that, after Hancock signed, the delegate from Massachusetts commented, "The British ministry can read that name without spectacles." Another report indicates that Hancock proudly declared, "There! I guess King George will be able to read that!"

A legend emerged years later about the signing of the Declaration, after the document had become an important national symbol. John Hancock is supposed to have said that Congress, having signed the Declaration, must now "all hang together", and Benjamin Franklin replied: "Yes, we must indeed all hang together, or most assuredly we shall all hang separately." That quotation first appeared in print in an 1837 London humor magazine.

The Syng inkstand used at the signing was also used at the signing of the United States Constitution in 1787.

Publication and reaction

After Congress approved the final wording of the Declaration on July 4, a handwritten copy was sent a few blocks away to the printing shop of John Dunlap. Through the night, Dunlap printed about 200 broadsides for distribution. The source copy used for this printing has been lost and may have been a copy in Thomas Jefferson's hand. It was read to audiences and reprinted in newspapers throughout the 13 states. The first formal public readings of the document took place on July 8, in Philadelphia (by John Nixon in the yard of Independence Hall), Trenton, New Jersey, and Easton, Pennsylvania; the first newspaper to publish it was The Pennsylvania Evening Post on July 6. A German translation of the Declaration was published in Philadelphia by July 9.

President of Congress John Hancock sent a broadside to General George Washington, instructing him to have it proclaimed "at the Head of the Army in the way you shall think it most proper". Washington had the Declaration read to his troops in New York City on July 9, with thousands of British troops on ships in the harbor. Washington and Congress hoped that the Declaration would inspire the soldiers, and encourage others to join the army. After hearing the Declaration, crowds in many cities tore down and destroyed signs or statues representing royal authority. An equestrian statue of King George in New York City was pulled down and the lead used to make musket balls.

One of the first readings of the Declaration by the British is believed to have taken place at the Rose and Crown Tavern on Staten Island, New York in the presence of General Howe. British officials in North America sent copies of the Declaration to Great Britain. It was published in British newspapers beginning in mid-August, it had reached Florence and Warsaw by mid-September, and a German translation appeared in Switzerland by October. The first copy of the Declaration sent to France got lost, and the second copy arrived only in November 1776. It reached Portuguese America by Brazilian medical student "Vendek" José Joaquim Maia e Barbalho, who had met with Thomas Jefferson in Nîmes.

The Spanish-American authorities banned the circulation of the Declaration, but it was widely transmitted and translated: by Venezuelan Manuel García de Sena, by Colombian Miguel de Pombo, by Ecuadorian Vicente Rocafuerte, and by New Englanders Richard Cleveland and William Shaler, who distributed the Declaration and the United States Constitution among Creoles in Chile and Indians in Mexico in 1821. The North Ministry did not give an official answer to the Declaration, but instead secretly commissioned pamphleteer John Lind to publish a response entitled Answer to the Declaration of the American Congress. British Tories denounced the signers of the Declaration for not applying the same principles of "life, liberty, and the pursuit of happiness" to African Americans. Thomas Hutchinson, the former royal governor of Massachusetts, also published a rebuttal. These pamphlets challenged various aspects of the Declaration. Hutchinson argued that the American Revolution was the work of a few conspirators who wanted independence from the outset, and who had finally achieved it by inducing otherwise loyal colonists to rebel. Lind's pamphlet had an anonymous attack on the concept of natural rights written by Jeremy Bentham, an argument that he repeated during the French Revolution. Both pamphlets questioned how the American slaveholders in Congress could proclaim that "all men are created equal" without freeing their own slaves.

William Whipple, a signer of the Declaration of Independence who had fought in the war, freed his slave Prince Whipple because of his revolutionary ideals. In the postwar decades, other slaveholders also freed their slaves; from 1790 to 1810, the percentage of free blacks in the Upper South increased to 8.3 percent from less than one percent of the black population. Northern states began abolishing slavery shortly after the war for Independence began, and all had abolished slavery by 1804.

Later in 1776, a group of 547 Loyalists, largely from New York, signed a Declaration of Dependence pledging their loyalty to the Crown.

History of the documents

The official copy of the Declaration of Independence was the one printed on July 4, 1776, under Jefferson's supervision. It was sent to the states and to the Army and was widely reprinted in newspapers. The slightly different "engrossed copy" (shown at the top of this article) was made later for members to sign. The engrossed version is the one widely distributed in the 21st century. Note that the opening lines differ between the two versions.

The copy of the Declaration that was signed by Congress is known as the engrossed or parchment copy. It was probably engrossed (that is, carefully handwritten) by clerk Timothy Matlack. A facsimile made in 1823 has become the basis of most modern reproductions rather than the original because of poor conservation of the engrossed copy through the 19th century. In 1921, custody of the engrossed copy of the Declaration was transferred from the State Department to the Library of Congress, along with the United States Constitution. After the Japanese attack on Pearl Harbor in 1941, the documents were moved for safekeeping to the United States Bullion Depository at Fort Knox in Kentucky, where they were kept until 1944. In 1952, the engrossed Declaration was transferred to the National Archives and is now on permanent display at the National Archives in the "Rotunda for the Charters of Freedom".

The document signed by Congress and enshrined in the National Archives is usually regarded as the Declaration of Independence, but historian Julian P. Boyd argued that the Declaration, like Magna Carta, is not a single document. Boyd considered the printed broadsides ordered by Congress to be official texts, as well. The Declaration was first published as a broadside that was printed the night of July 4 by John Dunlap of Philadelphia. Dunlap printed about 200 broadsides, of which 26 are known to survive. The 26th copy was discovered in The National Archives in England in 2009.

In 1777, Congress commissioned Mary Katherine Goddard to print a new broadside that listed the signers of the Declaration, unlike the Dunlap broadside. Nine copies of the Goddard broadside are known to still exist. A variety of broadsides printed by the states are also extant, including seven copies of the Solomon Southwick broadside, one of which was acquired by Washington University in St. Louis in 2015.

Several early handwritten copies and drafts of the Declaration have also been preserved. Jefferson kept a four-page draft that late in life he called the "original Rough draught". Historians now understand that Jefferson's Rough draft was one in a series of drafts used by the Committee of Five before being submitted to Congress for deliberation. According to Boyd, the first, "original" handwritten draft of the Declaration of Independence that predated Jefferson's Rough draft, was lost or destroyed during the drafting process.  It is not known how many drafts Jefferson wrote prior to this one, and how much of the text was contributed by other committee members. In 1947, Boyd discovered a fragment of an earlier draft in Jefferson's handwriting that predates Jefferson's Rough draft.  In 2018, the Thomas Paine National Historical Association published findings on an additional early handwritten draft of the Declaration, referred to as the "Sherman Copy", that John Adams copied from the lost "original draft" for Committee of Five members Roger Sherman and Benjamin Franklin's initial review. An inscription on the document noting "A beginning perhaps...", the early state of the text, and the manner in which this document was hastily taken, appears to chronologically place this draft earlier than both the fair Adams copy held in the Massachusetts Historical Society collection and the Jefferson "rough draft". After the text was finalized by Congress as a whole, Jefferson and Adams sent copies of the rough draft to friends, with variations noted from the original drafts.

During the writing process, Jefferson showed the rough draft to Adams and Franklin, and perhaps to other members of the drafting committee, who made a few more changes. Franklin, for example, may have been responsible for changing Jefferson's original phrase "We hold these truths to be sacred and undeniable" to "We hold these truths to be self-evident". Jefferson incorporated these changes into a copy that was submitted to Congress in the name of the committee. The copy that was submitted to Congress on June 28 has been lost and was perhaps destroyed in the printing process, or destroyed during the debates in accordance with Congress's secrecy rule.

On April 21, 2017, it was announced that a second engrossed copy had been discovered in the archives at West Sussex County Council in Chichester, England. Named by its finders the "Sussex Declaration", it differs from the National Archives copy (which the finders refer to as the "Matlack Declaration") in that the signatures on it are not grouped by States. How it came to be in England is not yet known, but the finders believe that the randomness of the signatures points to an origin with signatory James Wilson, who had argued strongly that the Declaration was made not by the States but by the whole people.

Years of exposure to damaging lighting resulted in the original Declaration of Independence document having much of its ink fade by 1876.

Legacy
The Declaration was given little attention in the years immediately following the American Revolution, having served its original purpose in announcing the independence of the United States. Early celebrations of Independence Day largely ignored the Declaration, as did early histories of the Revolution. The act of declaring independence was considered important, whereas the text announcing that act attracted little attention. The Declaration was rarely mentioned during the debates about the United States Constitution, and its language was not incorporated into that document. George Mason's draft of the Virginia Declaration of Rights was more influential, and its language was echoed in state constitutions and state bills of rights more often than Jefferson's words. "In none of these documents," wrote Pauline Maier, "is there any evidence whatsoever that the Declaration of Independence lived in men's minds as a classic statement of American political principles."

Influence in other countries
According to Pauline Maier, many leaders of the French Revolution admired the Declaration of Independence but were also interested in the new American state constitutions. The inspiration and content of the French Declaration of the Rights of Man and of the Citizen (1789) emerged largely from the ideals of the American Revolution. Lafayette prepared its key drafts, working closely in Paris with his friend Thomas Jefferson. It also borrowed language from George Mason's Virginia Declaration of Rights. The declaration also influenced the Russian Empire, and it had a particular impact on the Decembrist revolt and other Russian thinkers.

According to historian David Armitage, the Declaration of Independence did prove to be internationally influential, but not as a statement of human rights. Armitage argues that the Declaration was the first in a new genre of declarations of independence which announced the creation of new states. Other French leaders were directly influenced by the text of the Declaration of Independence itself. The Manifesto of the Province of Flanders (1790) was the first foreign derivation of the Declaration; others include the Venezuelan Declaration of Independence (1811), the Liberian Declaration of Independence (1847), the declarations of secession by the Confederate States of America (1860–61), and the Vietnamese Proclamation of Independence (1945). These declarations echoed the United States Declaration of Independence in announcing the independence of a new state, without necessarily endorsing the political philosophy of the original.

Other countries have used the Declaration as inspiration or have directly copied sections from it. These include the Haitian declaration of January 1, 1804 during the Haitian Revolution, the United Provinces of New Granada in 1811, the Argentine Declaration of Independence in 1816, the Chilean Declaration of Independence in 1818, Costa Rica in 1821, El Salvador in 1821, Guatemala in 1821, Honduras in 1821, Mexico in 1821, Nicaragua in 1821, Peru in 1821, Bolivian War of Independence in 1825, Uruguay in 1825, Ecuador in 1830, Colombia in 1831, Paraguay in 1842, Dominican Republic in 1844, Texas Declaration of Independence in March 1836, California Republic in November 1836, Hungarian Declaration of Independence in 1849, Declaration of the Independence of New Zealand in 1835, and the Czechoslovak declaration of independence from 1918 drafted in Washington D.C. with Gutzon Borglum among the drafters. The Rhodesian declaration of independence is based on the American one, as well, ratified in November 1965, although it omits the phrases "all men are created equal" and "the consent of the governed". The South Carolina declaration of secession from December 1860 also mentions the U.S. Declaration of Independence, though it omits references to "all men are created equal" and "consent of the governed".

Revival of interest
Interest in the Declaration was revived in the 1790s with the emergence of the United States's first political parties. Throughout the 1780s, few Americans knew or cared who wrote the Declaration. But in the next decade, Jeffersonian Republicans sought political advantage over their rival Federalists by promoting both the importance of the Declaration and Jefferson as its author. Federalists responded by casting doubt on Jefferson's authorship or originality, and by emphasizing that independence was declared by the whole Congress, with Jefferson as just one member of the drafting committee. Federalists insisted that Congress's act of declaring independence, in which Federalist John Adams had played a major role, was more important than the document announcing it. But this view faded away, like the Federalist Party itself, and, before long, the act of declaring independence became synonymous with the document.

A less partisan appreciation for the Declaration emerged in the years following the War of 1812, thanks to a growing American nationalism and a renewed interest in the history of the Revolution. In 1817, Congress commissioned John Trumbull's famous painting of the signers, which was exhibited to large crowds before being installed in the Capitol. The earliest commemorative printings of the Declaration also appeared at this time, offering many Americans their first view of the signed document. Collective biographies of the signers were first published in the 1820s, giving birth to what Garry Wills called the "cult of the signers". In the years that followed, many stories about the writing and signing of the document were published for the first time.

When interest in the Declaration was revived, the sections that were most important in 1776 were no longer relevant: the announcement of the independence of the United States and the grievances against King George. But the second paragraph was applicable long after the war had ended, with its talk of self-evident truths and unalienable rights. The identity of natural law since the 18th century has seen increasing ascendancy towards political and moral norms versus the law of nature, God, or human nature as seen in the past. The Constitution and the Bill of Rights lacked sweeping statements about rights and equality, and advocates of groups with grievances turned to the Declaration for support. Starting in the 1820s, variations of the Declaration were issued to proclaim the rights of workers, farmers, women, and others. In 1848, for example, the Seneca Falls Convention of women's rights advocates declared that "all men and women are created equal".

John Trumbull's Declaration of Independence (1817–1826)

John Trumbull's painting Declaration of Independence has played a significant role in popular conceptions of the Declaration of Independence. It is sometimes described as the signing of the Declaration of Independence, but it actually shows the Committee of Five presenting their draft of the Declaration to the Second Continental Congress on June 28, 1776, and not the signing of the document, which took place later.

Trumbull painted the figures from life whenever possible, but some had died and images could not be located; hence, the painting does not include all the signers of the Declaration. One figure had participated in the drafting but did not sign the final document; another refused to sign. In fact, the membership of the Second Continental Congress changed as time passed, and the figures in the painting were never in the same room at the same time. It is, however, an accurate depiction of the room in Independence Hall, the centerpiece of the Independence National Historical Park in Philadelphia, Pennsylvania.

Trumbull's painting has been depicted multiple times on U.S. currency and postage stamps. Its first use was on the reverse side of the $100 National Bank Note issued in 1863. A few years later, the steel engraving used in printing the bank notes was used to produce a 24-cent stamp, issued as part of the 1869 Pictorial Issue. An engraving of the signing scene has been featured on the reverse side of the United States two-dollar bill since 1976.

Slavery and the Declaration

The apparent contradiction between the claim that "all men are created equal" and the existence of slavery in the United States attracted comment when the Declaration was first published. Many of the founders understood the incompatibility of the statement of natural equality with the institution of slavery, but continued to enjoy the "Rights of Man". Jefferson had included a paragraph in his initial rough Draft of the Declaration of Independence vigorously condemning the evil of the slave trade, and condemning King George III for forcing it onto the colonies, but this was deleted from the final version.

He has waged cruel war against human nature itself, violating its most sacred rights of life and liberty in the persons of a distant people who never offended him, captivating and carrying them into slavery in another hemispere, or to incure miserable death in their transportation hither. this piratical warfare, the opprobium of infidel powers, is the warfare of the Christian king of Great Britain. Determined to keep open a market where MEN should be bought and sold, he has prostituted his negative for suppressing every legislative attempt to prohibit or to restrain this execrable commerce: and that this assemblage of horrors might want no fact of distinguished die, he is now exciting those very people to rise in arms among us, and to purchase that liberty of which he had deprived them, by murdering the people upon whom he also obtruded them: thus paying off former crimes committed against the liberties of one people, with crimes which he urges them to commit against the lives of another.

Jefferson himself was a prominent Virginia slaveowner, owning six hundred enslaved Africans on his Monticello plantation. Referring to this contradiction, English abolitionist Thomas Day wrote in a 1776 letter, "If there be an object truly ridiculous in nature, it is an American patriot, signing resolutions of independency with the one hand, and with the other brandishing a whip over his affrighted slaves." The African-American writer Lemuel Haynes expressed similar viewpoints in his essay "Liberty Further Extended", where he wrote that "Liberty is Equally as pre[c]ious to a Black man, as it is to a white one".

In the 19th century, the Declaration took on a special significance for the abolitionist movement. Historian Bertram Wyatt-Brown wrote that "abolitionists tended to interpret the Declaration of Independence as a theological as well as a political document". Abolitionist leaders Benjamin Lundy and William Lloyd Garrison adopted the "twin rocks" of "the Bible and the Declaration of Independence" as the basis for their philosophies. He wrote, "As long as there remains a single copy of the Declaration of Independence, or of the Bible, in our land, we will not despair." For radical abolitionists such as Garrison, the most important part of the Declaration was its assertion of the right of revolution. Garrison called for the destruction of the government under the Constitution, and the creation of a new state dedicated to the principles of the Declaration.

On July 5, 1852, Frederick Douglass delivered a speech asking the question, "What to the Slave Is the Fourth of July?".

The controversial question of whether to allow additional slave states into the United States coincided with the growing stature of the Declaration. The first major public debate about slavery and the Declaration took place during the Missouri controversy of 1819 to 1821. Anti-slavery Congressmen argued that the language of the Declaration indicated that the Founding Fathers of the United States had been opposed to slavery in principle, and so new slave states should not be added to the country. Pro-slavery Congressmen led by Senator Nathaniel Macon of North Carolina argued that the Declaration was not a part of the Constitution and therefore had no relevance to the question.

With the abolitionist movement gaining momentum, defenders of slavery such as John Randolph and John C. Calhoun found it necessary to argue that the Declaration's assertion that "all men are created equal" was false, or at least that it did not apply to black people. During the debate over the Kansas–Nebraska Act in 1853, for example, Senator John Pettit of Indiana argued that the statement "all men are created equal" was not a "self-evident truth" but a "self-evident lie". Opponents of the Kansas–Nebraska Act, including Salmon P. Chase and Benjamin Wade, defended the Declaration and what they saw as its antislavery principles.

John Brown's Declaration of Liberty
In preparing for his raid on Harpers Ferry, said by Frederick Douglass to be the beginning of the end of slavery in the United States, abolitionist John Brown had many copies printed of a Provisional Constitution. (When the seceding states created the Confederate States of America 16 months later, they operated for over a year under a Provisional Constitution.) It outlines the three branches of government in the quasi-country he hoped to set up in the Appalachian Mountains. It was widely reproduced in the press, and in full in the Select Senate Committee report on John Brown's insurrection (the Mason Report).

Much less known, as Brown did not have it printed, is his Declaration of Liberty, dated July 4, 1859, found among his papers at the Kennedy Farm. It was written out on sheets of paper attached to fabric, to allow it to be rolled, and it was rolled when found. The hand is that of Owen Brown, who often served as his father's amanuensis.

Imitating the vocabulary, punctuation, and capitalization of the 73-year-old U.S. Declaration, the 2000-word document begins:

The document was apparently intended to be read aloud, but so far as is known Brown never did so, even though he read the Provisional Constitution aloud the day the raid on Harpers Ferry began. Very much aware of the history of the American Revolution, he would have read the Declaration aloud after the revolt had started. The document was not published until 1894, and by someone who did not realize its importance and buried it in an appendix of documents. It is missing from most but not all studies of John Brown.

Lincoln and the Declaration

The Declaration's relationship to slavery was taken up in 1854 by Abraham Lincoln, a little-known former Congressman who idolized the Founding Fathers. Lincoln thought that the Declaration of Independence expressed the highest principles of the American Revolution, and that the Founding Fathers had tolerated slavery with the expectation that it would ultimately wither away. For the United States to legitimize the expansion of slavery in the Kansas–Nebraska Act, thought Lincoln, was to repudiate the principles of the Revolution. In his October 1854 Peoria speech, Lincoln said:

The meaning of the Declaration was a recurring topic in the famed debates between Lincoln and Stephen Douglas in 1858. Douglas argued that the phrase "all men are created equal" in the Declaration referred to white men only. The purpose of the Declaration, he said, had simply been to justify the independence of the United States, and not to proclaim the equality of any "inferior or degraded race". Lincoln, however, thought that the language of the Declaration was deliberately universal, setting a high moral standard to which the American republic should aspire. "I had thought the Declaration contemplated the progressive improvement in the condition of all men everywhere", he said. During the seventh and last joint debate with Steven Douglas at Alton, Illinois, on October 15, 1858, Lincoln said about the declaration:

According to Pauline Maier, Douglas's interpretation was more historically accurate, but Lincoln's view ultimately prevailed. "In Lincoln's hands," wrote Maier, "the Declaration of Independence became first and foremost a living document" with "a set of goals to be realized over time".

Like Daniel Webster, James Wilson, and Joseph Story before him, Lincoln argued that the Declaration of Independence was a founding document of the United States, and that this had important implications for interpreting the Constitution, which had been ratified more than a decade after the Declaration. The Constitution did not use the word "equality", yet Lincoln believed that the concept that "all men are created equal" remained a part of the nation's founding principles. He famously expressed this belief, referencing the year 1776, in the opening sentence of his 1863 Gettysburg Address: "Four score and seven years ago our fathers brought forth on this continent, a new nation, conceived in Liberty, and dedicated to the proposition that all men are created equal."

Lincoln's view of the Declaration became influential, seeing it as a moral guide to interpreting the Constitution. "For most people now," wrote Garry Wills in 1992, "the Declaration means what Lincoln told us it means, as a way of correcting the Constitution itself without overthrowing it." Admirers of Lincoln such as Harry V. Jaffa praised this development. Critics of Lincoln, notably Willmoore Kendall and Mel Bradford, argued that Lincoln dangerously expanded the scope of the national government and violated states' rights by reading the Declaration into the Constitution.

Women's suffrage and the Declaration

In July 1848, the Seneca Falls Convention was held in Seneca Falls, New York, the first women's rights convention. It was organized by Elizabeth Cady Stanton, Lucretia Mott, Mary Ann McClintock, and Jane Hunt. They patterned their "Declaration of Sentiments" on the Declaration of Independence, in which they demanded social and political equality for women. Their motto was that "All men and women are created equal", and they demanded the right to vote.
Excerpt from "Declaration of Sentiments": "We hold these truths to be self-evident, that all men and women are created equal"-The Declaration of Rights and Sentiments 1848

Civil Rights Movement and the Declaration 
1963, in Washington DC at the March on Washington for Jobs and Freedom, Reverend Martin Luther King, Jr delivered his famous "I Have a Dream" speech. This speech was meant to inspire the nation, to take up the causes of the Civil Rights Movement. Luther uses quotations from the Declaration of Independence to encourage equal treatment of all persons regardless of race.

Excerpt from Luther's speech: "I have a dream that one day this nation will rise up and live out the true meaning of its creed: ‘We hold these truths to be self-evident: that all men are created equal.'" –Reverend Martin Luther King, Jr. 1963

LGBTQ+  Rights Movement and the Declaration 
In 1978, at the Gay Pride Celebration in San Francisco, California, activist and later politician, Harvey Milk delivered a speech. Milk alluded to the Declaration of Independence, emphasizing that the inalienable rights established by Declaration apply to all persons and cannot be hindered because of one's sexual orientation.

Excerpt from Milk's speech: "All men are created equal and they are endowed with certain inalienable rights...that’s what America is. No matter how hard you try, you cannot erase those words from the Declaration of Independence." -Harvey Milk 1978In 2020, the Unitarian Universalist Association, responding to threats from the Trump Admiration to undermine civil rights protections for transgender individuals, mirrored the language of the Declaration of Independence, stating any such actions would "threaten the inalienable right to life, liberty and the pursuit of happiness."

20th century and later
The Declaration was chosen to be the first digitized text (1971).

The Memorial to the 56 Signers of the Declaration of Independence was dedicated in 1984 in Constitution Gardens on the National Mall in Washington, D.C., where the signatures of all the original signers are carved in stone with their names, places of residence, and occupations.

The new One World Trade Center building in New York City (2014) is 1776 feet high to symbolize the year that the Declaration of Independence was signed.

Popular culture
The adoption of the Declaration of Independence was dramatized in the 1969 Tony Award-winning musical 1776 and the 1972 film version, as well as in the 2008 television miniseries John Adams. In 1970, The 5th Dimension recorded the opening of the Declaration on their album Portrait in the song "Declaration". It was first performed on the Ed Sullivan Show on December 7, 1969, and it was taken as a song of protest against the Vietnam War. The Declaration of Independence is a plot device in the 2004 American film National Treasure. After the 2009 death of radio broadcaster Paul Harvey, Focus Today aired a "clip" of Harvey speaking about the lives of all the signers of the Declaration of Independence.

See also
 Journals of the Continental Congress
 Signers Monument

References

Bibliography 

 
 
 Boyd, Julian P., ed. The Papers of Thomas Jefferson, vol. 1. Princeton University Press, 1950.
 Boyd, Julian P. "The Declaration of Independence: The Mystery of the Lost Original" . Pennsylvania Magazine of History and Biography 100, number 4 (October 1976), 438–67.
 
 Christie, Ian R. and Benjamin W. Labaree. Empire or Independence, 1760–1776: A British-American Dialogue on the Coming of the American Revolution. New York: Norton, 1976.
 Dumbauld, Edward. The Declaration of Independence And What It Means Today. Norman: University of Oklahoma Press, 1950.
 Dupont, Christian Y. and Peter S. Onuf, eds. Declaring Independence: The Origins and Influence of America's Founding Document. Revised edition. Charlottesville, Virginia: University of Virginia Library, 2010. .
 
  
 Gustafson, Milton. "Travels of the Charters of Freedom" . Prologue Magazine 34, no 4 (Winter 2002).
 Hamowy, Ronald. "Jefferson and the Scottish Enlightenment: A Critique of Garry Wills's Inventing America: Jefferson's Declaration of Independence". William and Mary Quarterly, 3rd series, 36 (October 1979), 503–23.
 Hazelton, John H. The Declaration of Independence: Its History. Originally published 1906. New York: Da Capo Press, 1970. . 1906 edition available on Google Book Search
 Journals of the Continental Congress,1774–1789, Vol. 5 ( Library of Congress, 1904–1937)
 Lucas, Stephen E., "Justifying America: The Declaration of Independence as a Rhetorical Document", in Thomas W. Benson, ed., American Rhetoric: Context and Criticism, Carbondale, Illinois: Southern Illinois University Press, 1989
 
 
 Malone, Dumas. Jefferson the Virginian. Volume 1 of Jefferson and His Time. Boston: Little Brown, 1948.
 
 Mayer, Henry. All on Fire: William Lloyd Garrison and the Abolition of Slavery. New York: St. Martin's Press, 1998. .
 McDonald, Robert M. S. "Thomas Jefferson's Changing Reputation as Author of the Declaration of Independence: The First Fifty Years". Journal of the Early Republic 19, no. 2 (Summer 1999): 169–95.
 Middlekauff, Robert. The Glorious Cause: The American Revolution, 1763–1789. Revised and expanded edition. New York: Oxford University Press, 2005.
 Norton, Mary Beth, et al., A People and a Nation, Eighth Edition, Boston, Wadsworth, 2010. .
 
 Ritz, Wilfred J. "The Authentication of the Engrossed Declaration of Independence on July 4, 1776". Law and History Review 4, no. 1 (Spring 1986): 179–204.
 Ritz, Wilfred J. "From the Here of Jefferson's Handwritten Rough Draft of the Declaration of Independence to the There of the Printed Dunlap Broadside" . Pennsylvania Magazine of History and Biography 116, no. 4 (October 1992): 499–512.
 
 Warren, Charles. "Fourth of July Myths". The William and Mary Quarterly, Third Series, vol. 2, no. 3 (July 1945): 238–72. .
 United States Department of State, "The Declaration of Independence, 1776, 1911.
 
 Wyatt-Brown, Bertram. Lewis Tappan and the Evangelical War Against Slavery. Cleveland: Press of Case Western Reserve University, 1969. .
 "Declaration of Sentiments Full Text - Text of Stanton’s Declaration - Owl Eyes." Owleyes.org, 2018.
 NPR. "Read Martin Luther King Jr.'s ‘I Have a Dream" Speech in Its Entirety." NPR.org. NPR, January 18, 2010.
 "That's What America Is" , Harvey Milk,

External links

 "Declare the Causes: The Declaration of Independence" lesson plan for grades 9–12 from National Endowment for the Humanities
 Declaration of Independence at the National Archives
 Declaration of Independence at the Library of Congress
 Mobile-friendly Declaration of Independence

 
1776 in international relations
1776 in American law
Declaration of Independence
1776 works
American Enlightenment
American political philosophy literature
Declaration of Independence
Declaration of Independence
National human rights instruments
Declaration of Independence
Declaration of Independence